H. dichotoma  may refer to:
 Hoppea dichotoma, a plant species
 Hyphaene dichotoma, a palm species found in India